Taşbalta is a village in the Tillo District of Siirt Province in Turkey. The village is populated by Kurds and had a population of 99 in 2021.

The hamlets of Bakacak and Kavacık are attached to Taşbalta.

References 

Kurdish settlements in Siirt Province
Villages in Tillo District